Mill Creek is a  perennial stream that flows east from the Sierra Nevada Mountain Range into Mono Lake, in Mono County, California. It courses through Lundy Canyon and Lundy Lake, before passing through Mono City, California on its way to Mono Lake.

Watershed
Approximately 81 percent of the annual runoff of Mill Creek in the Mono Basin has been attributed to snowmelt, occurring from April through September, and the remaining 19 percent of the annual streamflow occurs as base flow from October through March.

History
William O. Lundy obtained a timber patent here in 1880. The settlement near the May lundy Mine was first known as Mill Creek. diverted to generate hydroelectric power in the early years of the 20th century. In 1911, the Lundy Project was completed and the dam raised the natural outlet of Lundy Lake 37 feet to an elevation of 7,803 feet so that hydroelectric power could be generated by the Southern Sierra Power Company.

Ecology
It is controversial whether North American beaver (Castor canadensis) were native to Mill Creek and the Mono Basin. Beaver were introduced, or re-introduced, along Mill Creek in the Mono Basin by the California Department of Fish and Game in the 1950s.  The population thrives above Lundy Reservoir for nearly the entire length of upper Lundy Canyon and in recent years has been spreading to nearby creeks, including Wilson Creek, DeChambeau Creek, and Lee Vining Creek.

Hiking
The Lundy Canyon trail leads past several cascading waterfalls to Lake Helen, then becomes more moderate in the "20 Lakes Basin". Trails circle toward Saddlebag lake and to the foot of North Peak and Mount Conness on the Yosemite National Park boundary.

See also
 Beaver in the Sierra Nevada
 List of rivers in California
 Mono Lake

References

External links
 Mono Lake Committee

Rivers of Mono County, California
Rivers of the Sierra Nevada (United States)
Inyo National Forest
Rivers of the Great Basin
Rivers of Northern California
Rivers of the Sierra Nevada in California